Underbelly NZ: Land of the Long Green Cloud is a six-part New Zealand television mini-series. The series originally aired from 17 August 2011 to 21 September 2011. It was the first Underbelly series to be created outside of Australia, and depicts events prior to and concurrent with Underbelly: A Tale of Two Cities.

Plot
The series is an account of the rise and fall of New Zealand's 'Mr. Asia', Marty Johnstone (Dan Musgrove), who built the country's first ever drug cartel, the Syndicate. Set between 1972 and 1980, it traces Johnstone's development from small-time crook to international playboy with a global drug empire, and how he became the architect of his own demise. Closely aligned with Johnstone's tale is that of Detective Constable Ben Charlton (Jamie Irvine), who realises that changing criminal tactics will necessitate drastic alterations in New Zealand policing. Charlton also acts as the narrator of the series.

The six-part narrative can be seen as a prequel of sorts to the Australian series Underbelly: A Tale of Two Cities, which focuses on fellow Kiwi and Syndicate member, Terry Clark. However, events in the two shows do overlap, as both cover the period 1976–1980. Characters that appear in both shows include Clark, Johnstone, Andy Maher and Karen Soich, but none of the actors reprise their roles in the New Zealand series.

Production and airing
On 21 December 2010, New Zealand on Air announced it would contribute almost NZD$3.9 million to TV3 and production company Screentime for six one-hour episodes of Underbelly NZ, saying that the Marty Johnstone story was "a dramatic part of New Zealand's history - in some ways the end of innocence for us and our police force."

The mini-series began filming in April 2011, around the same time as Underbelly: Razor. All six episodes were scripted by  screenwriter John Banas, known for his work on Australian crime shows such as City Homicide and Blue Heelers. Mike Smith directed four of the episodes, while series producer Ric Pellizzeri took the director's chair for the remaining two.

The show was originally set to debut on 10 August 2011 at 8:30pm, but NZ On Air asked TV3 to move its timeslot to avoid clashing with another local drama, Nothing Trivial, on rival channel TVNZ. Eventually, the show was moved to 9:30pm and broadcast delayed by a week.

On 22 September 2011, a day after the TV broadcast ended, the complete series was released as a two-disc set on DVD.

Cast and characters
Underbelly NZ: Land of the Long Green Cloud features 12 regular cast members, with others who recur through the series.

Dan Musgrove stars as the drug dealer, Marty Johnstone, also known as 'Mr. Asia', and Thijs Morris plays his right-hand man, Andy Maher. On the police side, Detective Constable Ben Charlton, the narrator of the series, is played by Jamie Irvine, and Holly Shanahan portrays his colleague, Detective Constable Caroline Derwent. Other members of the regular cast include Andrew Laing as DSS Laurie Mackenzie, Calvin Tuteao as Diamond Jim Shepherd, Damien Avery as Det. 'Goose' Gosling, Richard Knowles as DS 'Ding' Bell, Edith Poor as Bonnie Marie Jones, Gary Young as Chinese Jack, Joel Tobeck as Gary Majors, and Stelios Yiakmis as Big Ari.

The recurring cast includes:

 Daniel Musgrove as Marty Johnstone
 Erroll Shand as Terry Clark
 Aaron Thomas Ward as Pommy Harry Lewis
 Mark Warren as Max Bracewell
 Arthur Meek as Doug Wilson
 Colin Moy as Sgt 'Skin' Skinner
 Fleur Saville as Sue MacPherson
 Geoff Snell as Keith Aitken
 Grae Burton as Peter Miller
 Jason Hoyte as Pat Booth
 Johnny Barker as Josh Easby
 Rachael Blampied as Farah Wainwright
 Scott Wills as Clive Pilborough
 Aimee Gestro as Jenny Olsen

 Dawn Adams as Sonya Turner
 Denise Snoad as Leila Barclay
 Edwin Wright as Freddie Russell
 Grant McFarland as Piak
 Jaime Passier-Armstrong as Isobel Wilson
 John Leigh as Mac The Mick
 Peter Tait as CS Chesterfield
 Tahl Kennedy as Stephen Johnstone
 Will Hall as Greg Ollard
 Anna Jullienne as Deb Masters
 Melissa Reeve as Karen Soich

Critical reception
The series was generally well received in New Zealand. Chris Philpott of Stuff.co.nz called it "an interesting, albeit familiar, story focusing on a riveting character on a fascinating journey, that was performed and produced to an extremely high standard." However, some criticised the show for emphasising style over substance, sacrificing character development for a fast-paced story.

Episodes

International broadcast 
  — The series aired on Go! from 28 December 2013.

References

External links
 Official TV3 Website
 Production Website
 

New Zealand television miniseries
Three (TV channel) original programming
Television series set in the 1970s
Television series set in the 1980s
Television shows funded by NZ on Air
2011 New Zealand television series debuts
New Zealand drama television series
2011 New Zealand television series endings
2010s television miniseries
Television series about organized crime
Television series about illegal drug trade
Works about organised crime in New Zealand
Television series by Screentime